María Guadalupe González Romero (born 9 January 1989), better known as Lupita González, is a Mexican racewalker. She was the gold medalist at the 2015 Pan American Games and is the national record holder in the 20 kilometres race walk.

Career
Raised in the State of Mexico, she first emerged as an elite level walker in the 2013 season. The 2013 Central American and Caribbean Championships in Athletics saw her claim the 10,000 metres race walk gold medal for the host nation. She soon established herself as the nation's best walker, with a new Mexican national record of 1:28:48 at the 2014 IAAF World Race Walking Cup, where she placed 16th overall in the 20 kilometres race walk event. She also broke the 15 km walk record en route to that distance.

On her debut appearance at the 2015 Pan American Race Walking Cup she was a clear winner in the 20 km walk, crossing the line in a championship record time of 1:29:21 hours – nearly two minutes ahead of runner-up Kimberly García. González's performance led Mexico to the women's team title, alongside her compatriots Alejandra Ortega and Lizbeth Silva. She was among the leading entrants at the Pan American Games two months later and came away with the gold medal, restoring Mexico's initial success in the event which had ended after Victoria Palacios's win in 2003. Hot and humid weather conditions during the race in Toronto affected González, who despite having a winning margin of over half a minute and breaking the games record collapsed after finishing the distance.

María Guadalupe then won the Race Walking World Cup in Rome and was regarded as one of the favorites to win the Olympic Games, and won silver, becoming the first female Mexican race walker to step on the Olympic podium.

That same year she also went on to win the 2016 IAAF Race Walking Challenge series.

She is banned until 15 November 2026 for an anti-doping rule violation and tampering with the anti-doping process. She was initially banned for testing positive for trenbolone. She was then banned for four years for using forged documents and false testimonies in an attempt to overturn her ban.

Personal bests
10,000 metres race walk – 47:48.30 (2013)
10 kilometres race walk – 43:49 (2015)
15 kilometres race walk – 1:06:55 (2014) 
20 kilometres race walk – 1:28:37 (2016)

International competitions

References

External links
  

Living people
1989 births
People from Tlalnepantla de Baz
Sportspeople from the State of Mexico
Mexican female racewalkers
Pan American Games gold medalists for Mexico
Pan American Games medalists in athletics (track and field)
Athletes (track and field) at the 2015 Pan American Games
Olympic athletes of Mexico
Olympic silver medalists for Mexico
Athletes (track and field) at the 2016 Summer Olympics
Olympic silver medalists in athletics (track and field)
Medalists at the 2016 Summer Olympics
World Athletics Championships athletes for Mexico
World Athletics Championships medalists
World Athletics Race Walking Team Championships winners
Medalists at the 2015 Pan American Games
Doping cases in athletics
Mexican sportspeople in doping cases
21st-century Mexican women